Keysville is an unincorporated community in Rappahannock County, in the U.S. state of Virginia.

References

Unincorporated communities in Rappahannock County, Virginia
Unincorporated communities in Virginia